A Time to Live is a 1985 American made-for-television drama film directed by Rick Wallace and starring Liza Minnelli (in her television film debut), Jeffrey DeMunn, Swoosie Kurtz, Scott Schwartz and Corey Haim. It was broadcast on NBC on October 28, 1985.

The film is based on the 1982 book Intensive Care written by Mary-Lou Weisman which tells the true story of the Weismans' experience and struggle to raise their son Peter, who had muscular dystrophy. For her performance, Minnelli won a Golden Globe Award for Best Performance by an Actress in a Miniseries or Motion Picture Made for Television.

Synopsis
Mary-Lou and Larry Weisman first learned that their younger son, Peter, had muscular dystrophy when he was two-and-a-half years old. The doctor told them that the child's muscles would slowly atrophy, and he would eventually die of pneumonia. Mary-Lou and Larry fought to make the next thirteen years that Peter lived intensely loving and fulfilling. And, in the process, they learned a lot about themselves, their marriage, their sons and the importance of the quality of life over the quantity of life.

Cast

Liza Minnelli as Mary-Lou Weisman
Jeffrey DeMunn as Larry Weisman
Swoosie Kurtz as Patricia
Scott Schwartz as Adam Weisman
Corey Haim as Peter Weisman
Henry G. Sanders as Fred

Production
A Time to Live was filmed from August 12 to September 1985 on location in Montreal, Quebec, Canada.

Awards and nominations

Home media
In 1986, A Time to Live was released on VHS by Vista Home Video.

References

External links

1985 television films
1985 films
1985 drama films
American biographical drama films
American films based on actual events
NBC network original films
Medical-themed films
Muscular dystrophy
ITC Entertainment films
Films shot in Montreal
American drama television films
1980s English-language films
1980s American films